Santa Sabina College (abbreviated as Santa, Santa Sabina or SSC) is a multi-campus independent Roman Catholic, single-sex, early learning, primary and secondary day school for girls from Year 5 to Year 12; and a co-educational day school from early learning years through Prep to Year 4. Established in 1894, Santa Sabina has a non-selective enrolment policy and as of 2007 catered to approximately 1,400 students.

The College is owned by the Congregation of Dominican Sisters of Eastern Australia and the Solomon Islands and located within the Archdiocese of Sydney. The College is affiliated with the Association of Heads of Independent Schools of Australia (AHISA), the Junior School Heads Association of Australia (JSHAA) and an affiliate member of the Association of Heads of Independent Girls' Schools (AHIGS). The College Principal is Paulina Skerman.

History
Eight Dominican sisters arrived from Ireland in 1867, to establish schools for Catholic children in New South Wales. Subsequently  of land and a house in Strathfield were purchased from a wine-grower, Harold Lindeman. Santa Sabina College was established on this site in January 1894, with seven day students. The first three boarders were enrolled in April of that same year.

Although the College saw its first student matriculate in 1906, it was not officially recognised as a secondary school until 1912, with the passing of the New South Wales Bursary Act. Organised sport was first introduced in 1918, with Tennis the most popular sport at the time.

In 1936, Santa's most prominent building, Holyrood—originally built as Illyria by industrialist Charles Hoskins in the early 1890s—was purchased from William Adams of the Tattersall's Hotel. The carved sandstone facade came from the City Bank building in Moore Street (now Martin Place). This building was used as the College boarding house until boarding ceased in 1976. The building now houses the College music department. The Del Monte property, located across the road from the College, was leased in 1949, with the first primary school students taking up residence later that year. In 1950, the owner of the property, Mary Bailey, died, leaving the property to the Sisters. Del Monte was subsequently renamed Santa Maria del Monte. Santa Maria del Monte was expanded in 1968, with the purchase of Lauriston, which had been the home of the Presbyterian Ladies' College, Sydney during the Second World War. This purchase provided the school with a sports ground and additional classrooms.

In 1991 the campus was used as the backdrop for the Australian TV series Brides of Christ.

1996 saw the establishment of the Out of School Hours Centre (OOSH), and in 1997, a property at Tallong was purchased for outdoor education. In 1998, Mary Bailey House was opened as an Early Childhood Centre, and in 2002 classes for Years 6 and 7 commenced at the middle school campus, Martin De Porres.

Santa Sabina is recognised as an employer of choice for women by the Equal Opportunity for Women in the Workplace Agency.

Principals
The following individuals have served as Principal of Santa Sabina College:

The current principal, Ms Skerman was previously, the principal at an independent, Catholic, girls’ secondary day and boarding school for 5 years. She is a member of the Australian Heads of Independent Schools and the Alliance of Girls’ Schools Australasia. In 2017, she was named as a Finalist in the Telstra Business Women’s Award for leading growth and inclusivity through innovation.

Campus 
The College comprises five campuses: four situated along The Boulevarde in Strathfield, and an outdoor education campus at Tallong in the Southern Highlands of New South Wales. The four city campuses are Mary Bailey House Early Education Centre (Pre-school), Santa Maria del Monte (Primary Years) and Santa Sabina (Middle and Senior Years). Santa Maria del Monte also takes boy students from Kindergarten to Year 4, with most boys then continuing on to St. Patrick's College to complete their schooling.

The Strathfield campus includes a  outdoor swimming pool, six tennis courts, three ovals and a chapel. In 2002, a Middle School was established for students in Years 6 and 7. In 2005 The Aquinas Centre was opened, featuring a library, lecture theatre and student services facility.

Co-curricular activities

Debating
The College debating activities include: The Archdale Competition for Years 7 to 12, against twenty similar type independent girls' schools; the AHIGS Festival of Speech; the Catholic Schools' Debating competition; Schools' Speaking competition; the Catholic Schools' Speaking competition; the Junior Legacy Speaking competition; Senior Plain English Speaking competition; and the Rostrum Voice of Youth Competition.
 
Middle and Secondary School students participate in social debates with schools such as St Gregory's College, Campbelltown, Saint Ignatius' College, Riverview, and St Vincent's College, whilst the Primary and Middle School debate MLC School and PLC Sydney.

Debating and Public Speaking is also offered through inter-house competitions.

Arts
Santa Sabina is seen as the sister school to St Patrick's College. As such the two schools combine drama classes to stage shows, and musicals.

Sport
The sporting program at Santa Sabina includes: School sporting clubs, Saturday and midweek competitions, gala days, and representative opportunities up to national level. Each year the College takes about 2500 sports registrations for approximately 85 sports competitions and activities across 22 sports.

Notable alumnae

 Monica Attard, ABC senior broadca
 Robyn Butler, writer, actress and producer
 Margaret Cunneen  , Deputy Senior Crown Prosecutor
 Carmen Duncan, actress
 Paula Duncan, actress
 Cathy Foley, chief of the CSIRO materials and engineering division
 Cynthia Mitchell, Paralympian (Skiing)
 Julia Morris, actress/comedian
 Rahni Sadler, Seven Network news reporter and United States foreign correspondent
 Justine Schofield, former Masterchef Australia contestant, television personality
 Alice Spigelman , Chair Sculpture by the Sea
 Yvonne Strahovski, actress
 Simone Thurtell, Australian Broadcasting Corporation's Grandstand announcer

Gallery

See also 

 List of non-government schools in New South Wales
 Siena College (Camberwell)
 Catholic education in Australia

References

External links 
 

Catholic primary schools in Sydney
Educational institutions established in 1894
Catholic secondary schools in Sydney
Girls' schools in New South Wales
Association of Heads of Independent Girls' Schools
Junior School Heads Association of Australia Member Schools
Dominican schools in Australia
Strathfield, New South Wales
1894 establishments in Australia
Alliance of Girls' Schools Australasia